The 2013–14 New Mexico State Aggies women's basketball team represented New Mexico State University during the 2013–14 NCAA Division I women's basketball season. The Aggies, led by third year head coach Mark Trakh, played their home games at the Pan American Center and were members of the Western Athletic Conference. They came into the season as the most senior member of the WAC and as the defending WAC Conference Tournament Champions. The Aggies would finish the season at 11–20 and claim the 5-seed in the WAC Tournament.

Roster

Schedule
Source

|-
!colspan=9 style="background:#FFFFFF; color:#882345;"| Exhibition

|-
!colspan=9 style="background:#882345; color:white;"| Regular Season

|-
!colspan=9 style="background:#FFFFFF; color:#882345;"| 2014 WAC women's basketball tournament

See also
 2013–14 New Mexico State Aggies men's basketball team

References

New Mexico State Aggies women's basketball seasons
New Mexico State
Aggies
Aggies